Paddy Neary (born 1956) is an Irish retired hurler and referee who played as a left corner-back for the Kilkenny senior team.

Neary joined the team during the 1975-76 National League and was a regular member of the team until his retirement from inter-county hurling almost a decade later. During that time he won one National Hurling League winners' medal. He also won two All-Ireland winners' medals as a non-playing substitute.

At club level Neary is a two-time All-Ireland medalist with James Stephens. In addition to this he has also won two Leinster winners' medals and three county club championship winners' medals.

References

1956 births
Living people
James Stephens hurlers
Kilkenny inter-county hurlers
Hurling referees